Kevin Brodie (born May 31, 1952) is an American film director, screenwriter, and former child actor. He is the son of actors Steve Brodie and Barbara Ann Stillwell.

Career 
As a child, Brodie had small roles in such films as Some Came Running (directed by Vincente Minnelli, 1958), The Five Pennies (1959) and Battle at Bloody Beach (1961). His first major role was in The Night of the Grizzly (1966), playing the son of Clint Walker. In 1967, he appeared in the comedy Eight on the Lam. During the same period he also made guest appearances on such popular television shows as Cheyenne, Ben Casey, Death Valley Days, My Three Sons, Mister Ed, and Mannix. In 1975 he was one of the leads in the low budget sci-fi thriller The Giant Spider Invasion, appearing with his father, Steve Brodie.

In the 1970s, he moved into production, working as an assistant director, line producer and writer. He has written and directed a small number of films in genres ranging from exploitation comedy (Delta Pi aka Mugsy's Girls, 1985) to thriller (Treacherous, 1993) and family fare (A Dog of Flanders, 1999).

Personal life
He was married to Joanna Dierck (born January 3, 1953), who has appeared in some of his films. His daughter is actress Farren Monet (born November 8, 1987), who appeared in A Dog of Flanders.

Filmography

Film

Television

Bibliography
 Holmstrom, John. The Moving Picture Boy: An International Encyclopaedia from 1895 to 1995. Norwich, Michael Russell, 1996, p. 294.

References

External links

1952 births
Living people
American male child actors
American film directors
American male screenwriters